Espinhal is a civil parish in the municipality of Penela, Portugal.

References

Freguesias of Penela